Matej Madleňák (born 7 February 1999) is a Slovak professional footballer who plays for Ružomberok as a defender.

Club career

MFK Ružomberok
Madleňák made his Fortuna Liga debut for Ružomberok against AS Trenčín on 29 July 2018.

International career
Madleňák was first recognised in Slovak senior national team nomination in November 2022 by Francesco Calzona being listed as an alternate for two friendly fixtures against Montenegro and Marek Hamšík's retirement game against Chile. He remained in the same position for December prospective national team players' training camp.

References

External links
 MFK Ružomberok official profile 
 Futbalnet profile 
 
 

1999 births
Living people
People from Námestovo District
Sportspeople from the Žilina Region
Slovak footballers
Slovakia youth international footballers
Association football defenders
MFK Ružomberok players
3. Liga (Slovakia) players
2. Liga (Slovakia) players
Slovak Super Liga players